Bullet Bob may refer to:
Bob Armstrong (born 1939–2020) American professional wrestler
Bob Hayes (1942–2002), American Olympic sprinter and Pro Football Hall of Fame wide receiver 
Bob Feller (1918–2010), American baseball pitcher
Bob Kiesel (1911–1993), American sprinter
Bob Turley (1930–2013), American baseball pitcher
Bob Westfall (1919–1980), American football fullback